|}

The Prix Vermeille is a Group 1 flat horse race in France open to thoroughbred fillies and mares aged three years or older. It is run at Longchamp over a distance of 2,400 metres (about 1½ miles), and it is scheduled to take place each year in September.

History
The event is named after a filly foaled in 1853. She was initially known as Merveille, but was later renamed Vermeille. She did not have a remarkable racing career, but was highly successful as a broodmare.

The Prix Vermeille was established in 1897, and was originally restricted to fillies aged three. Due to World War I, it was abandoned from 1914 to 1918.

The event was cancelled twice during World War II, in 1939 and 1940. It was temporarily switched to Le Tremblay in 1943 and 1944.

The race was opened to four-year-old fillies in 2004, and to older mares in 2006.

Preceded by the Poule d'Essai des Pouliches and the Prix de Diane, the Prix Vermeille is the final leg of France's fillies' Triple Crown. The feat of winning all three has been achieved by six horses, most recently Zarkava in 2008.

The Prix Vermeille is held three weeks before the Prix de l'Arc de Triomphe, and it sometimes serves as a trial for that event. The 2013 winner, Treve was the sixth horse to win both races in the same year.

Records

Most successful horse (2 wins):
 Treve – 2013, 2015

Leading jockey (7 wins):
 Yves Saint-Martin – Golden Girl (1963), Casaque Grise (1967), Saraca (1969), Allez France (1973), Paulista (1974), Sharaya (1983), Darara (1986)

Leading trainer (7 wins):
 Alain de Royer-Dupré – Sharaya (1983), Darara (1986), Daryaba (1999), Shawanda (2005), Mandesha (2006), Zarkava (2008), Shareta (2012)

Leading owner (7 wins):
 Marcel Boussac – Durban (1921), Merry Girl (1928), La Circe (1933), Corteira (1948), Janiari (1956), Arbencia (1957), Astola (1961, dead-heat)
 HH Aga Khan – Sharaya (1983), Darara (1986), Daryaba (1999), Shawanda (2005), Mandesha (2006), Zarkava (2008), Shareta (2012)

Winners since 1965

Earlier winners

 1897: Ortie Blanche
 1898: Melina
 1899: Sesara
 1900: Semendria
 1901: La Camargo
 1902: Ophelia
 1903: Mater
 1904: Profane
 1905: Brienne
 1906: Bethsaida
 1907: Claudia
 1908: Medeah
 1909: Ronde de Nuit
 1910: Basse Pointe
 1911: Tripolette
 1912: Reveuse
 1913: Moia
 1914–18: no race
 1919: Stearine
 1920: Meddlesome Maid
 1921: Durban
 1922: Sainte Ursule
 1923: Quoi
 1924: Isola Bella
 1925: La Habanera
 1926: Dorina
 1927: Samphire
 1928: Merry Girl
 1929: Calandria
 1930: Commanderie
 1931: Pearl Cap
 1932: Kiddie
 1933: La Circe
 1934: Mary Tudor
 1935: Crisa
 1936: Mistress Ford
 1937: Tonnelle
 1938: Ma Normandie
 1939–40: no race
 1941: Longthanh
 1942: Vigilance
 1943: Folle Nuit
 1944: La Belle du Canet
 1945: Nikellora
 1946: Pirette
 1947: Procureuse
 1948: Corteira
 1949: Bagheera
 1950: Kilette
 1951: Orberose
 1952: La Mirambule
 1953: Radio
 1954: Philante
 1955: Wild Miss
 1956: Janiari
 1957: Arbencia
 1958: Bella Paola
 1959: Mi Carina
 1960: Lezghinka
 1961: Anne la Douce / Astola 
 1962: Monade
 1963: Golden Girl
 1964: Astaria

See also
 List of French flat horse races

References

 France Galop / Racing Post:
 galop.courses-france.com:
 1897–1919, 1920–1949, 1950–1979, 1980–present
 france-galop.com – A Brief History: Prix Vermeille.
 galopp-sieger.de – Prix Vermeille.
 horseracingintfed.com – International Federation of Horseracing Authorities – Prix Vermeille (2018).
 pedigreequery.com – Prix Vermeille – Longchamp.

Long-distance horse races for fillies and mares
Longchamp Racecourse
Horse races in France
Recurring sporting events established in 1897
1897 establishments in France